, also abbreviated as , is a Japanese manga series written and illustrated by Soborou. It has been serialized in Kodansha's seinen manga magazine Weekly Young Magazine since April 2017, and has been collected in eleven tankōbon volumes as of November 2020. Each volume features different pairs of female teachers and their male students as they inevitably end up in awkward, embarrassing situations as they gradually become couples. An anime television series adaptation by Tear Studio aired from April to June 2019.

Summary
High school student Ichiro Sato keeps finding himself in embarrassingly erotic predicaments with Kana Kojima, a young teacher who has a reputation of being a demon to her students. Later volumes introduce more male students paired with female teachers in similar circumstances.

Characters

Teachers

A high school Japanese language teacher at  who is nicknamed  because of her combustible temper.  But when she is close to Ichirō Satō, she is shy and clumsy, and they end up in a number of unseemly erotic situations. It is revealed that she is from the same home town as Sato's mother. As a high school student, she was shy and wore glasses, but was encouraged by Sato to become a teacher. Starting in volume 2, she and Sato are a couple. A bonus chapter in Volume 1 shows that she visits him often while he is in college. She and Ichiro later get engaged and are living together by Volume 6.

Kawanuma West art teacher and student council adviser. Though she is very petite she is also exceptionally well-endowed and styles her hair in braids. She is well-liked by the students who call her  as she is kind and gentle. Like Kojima, she becomes really clumsy and air-headed when she is around the guy she likes, which would be Rin Suzuki, who helped her in the past when she was trying to get to her teacher certification exam on time.

A physical education teacher from Kawanuma East. She is tomboyish, mischievous and free-spirited, and is liked by her students. She advises the student council and coaches the swim team. She acts very casual around Takashi, and genuinely cares about him. They eventually start dating.

The Kawanuma East school nurse. She has light grey hair. Initially wanting to relate better with students in general, she takes a liking to Ko Tanaka, and has no issue with changing her clothes in front of him. She eventually accepts his confession at the end of the volume and they lose their virginity to one other in a love hotel in the bonus chapter. She and Tanaka eventually marry and have a daughter by Volume 8.

A new assistant language teacher at Kawanuma West. She is 15 years old and a former schoolmate of Saya and Yorito. She had skipped a few grades, studied abroad and graduated from university, and returned to Japan. She likes Yorito and hopes to win his affections.
 
A geography and history teacher at Asaoka Private Senior High, she is a petite woman with long dark hair who is known as a "stalker ghost" for appearing suddenly near students and revealing their personal information, which she studied so she could become closer with her students.
 
A young woman who is a prominent member of a Japanese idol girl group called . She and Yamato are childhood friends that Yamato calls her Sakura-nee-chan. She is secretly a very serious person who studies all the time, and becomes a student teacher at Asaoka High under the name Ouka Okamoto and wears glasses and has plain black hair.

Students

A 17 year old Kawanuma West High School student in his third year who continues to find himself involved in embarrassing situations with his teacher Kana Kojima. He is a good student who is ready to graduate and move on to university. In Volume 2, he reveals to his friend Rin Suzuki that he and Kana are dating. In the Volume 1 bonus chapter, he is a university student who is frequently visited by Kana. 

A second-year student at Kawanuma West. He has a scary appearance because of his size and his eyes, but has been a friend of Satō since junior high. Satō asks Rin to try to make new friends since he is graduating and spending more time with Kana. Rin struggles in that aspect, but more often than not, he finds himself in embarrassing situations with teacher Mayu Matsukaze. Two years later, he and Mayu get married.

Mayu's younger sister, a high school student at Kawanuma West and the student council treasurer. She wears glasses, and is more sensible than her air-headed sister. She later becomes the student council president.

A first-year student at Kawanuma East and the student council treasurer. He is a neighbor to Hazakura-sensei, whom he calls Hika, but is always being treated like a kid by her. Despite this, they eventually start dating and become a couple.

A third-year student at Kawanuma East, and friend of Sato and Suzuki from junior high. He was a student council president. Three months prior to graduating, he swears he will have a girlfriend, but ends up in embarrassing situations with Tachibana. His love confession is eventually accepted after he graduates.

A first-year student at Kawanuma West when Saya becomes a third-year. He has a crush on Saya, but more often than not, finds himself in embarrassing situations with Francesca Homura.
 
A third-year high school student at Asaoka High who does not go to school but spends most of his time working. He ends up being with Inokawa-sensei in a number of situations. He starts dating her in the bonus chapter.
 
He is childhood friends with Sakura Okamoto, who has since become famous, and is shocked to discover she has become his teacher. He is captain of the track team.

Others

Ichiro's mother & Kana's childhood friend.

Ichiro's younger sister.

Izumi's younger brother.

Media

Manga
Why the Hell are You Here, Teacher!? is written and illustrated by Soborou. The series was initially published in Kodansha's Weekly Young Magazine as a series of one-shots under the title Golden Times. It began serialization in the same magazine on April 24, 2017.
Kodansha has compiled its chapters into individual volumes. The first volume was published on January 6, 2017. As of November 6, 2020, eleven volumes have been released. In August 2020, it was announced that the manga would be entering on hiatus due to the author Soborou's illness starting to worsen.

In June 2020, it was announced that BookWalker Global partnered with Kodansha USA to release Why the Hell are You Here, Teacher!? in English language, and the first three volumes were released digitally on July 14, 2020.

Volume list

Anime
An anime television series adaptation was announced in the 44th issue of Weekly Young Magazine on October 1, 2018. The series was directed by Toshikatsu Tokoro and animated by Tear Studio. Character designs for the series were done by Kazuhiko Tamura. Yūki Takabayashi and Yuri Fujimaru handled the series composition, while Hiraku Kaneko served as chief director and Gin composed the music. The series aired from April 8 to June 24, 2019 on Tokyo MX, BS11, and AT-X. Sumire Uesaka performed the series' opening theme song . Sentai Filmworks licensed the series for worldwide regions, excluding Asia. The series ran for 12 episodes. An unaired episode was included in the anime's Blu-ray box, which was released on December 11, 2019. On July 6, 2019, Sentai announced that they were producing a dub for the series.

Reception
Anime News Network reviewers had mixed reviews about the anime show. James Beckett wrote, "This isn't a 'good' show, but God help me, I chuckled a little at just how unashamed it was." Lynzee Loveridge wrote that "it's edited porn airing on a Japanese satellite station." Nick Creamer wrote that the episode "definitely knows how to set up a sexually charged scene, and even has the production values to make its characters look genuinely attractive". Theron Martin wrote "If you find suppositories and someone holding in pee to be sexy then you might like this one, but it's definitely aimed only at a certain kind of kink."

Allen Moody of THEM Anime Reviews gave the anime show 1 out of 5 stars, noticing the "tiresomely repetitive fanservice formula in use" and heavy censoring that "None of this is really funny- as presented, it's not sexy either-" He found the groping scenes to be endlessly repetitive, and "along with all the related humiliation and embarrassment of the women here, that finally completely wore out my patience".

Notes

Works cited
  "Ch." is shortened form for chapter and refers to a chapter number of the Why the Hell are You Here, Teacher!? manga.

References

External links
  
  
 

2019 anime television series debuts
Anime series based on manga
Erotic romance anime and manga
Kodansha manga
Romantic comedy anime and manga
School life in anime and manga
Seinen manga
Sentai Filmworks
Sex comedy anime and manga
Teaching anime and manga
Tear Studio